Imran Junaidi (Urdu-عمران جنیدی) was a rock climber and mountaineer from Islamabad, Pakistan. He is best known for first Pakistani ascent of Malika Parbat, and a new route on little Trango in the Trango group. In 2015 Junaidi along with two other teammates went missing while on an expedition in the Himalayan mountains in Kashmir. A search operation was initiated which ended after about three weeks without any success. Junaidi was 33.

Climbing 
Imran Junaidi was a passionate climber. He had been engaged in outdoor pursuits since 1998. Junaidi was the winner of several national level rock climbing competitions, and he had an exceptional record in mix and rock climbing expeditions.

Competition records
 3rd place at All Pakistan Rock Climbing Competition - 2010 (18+), Jasmine Center Maragalla Hills, 2010
 1st place at IMD 2010 Climbing Competition ( 19 + / Open ), Ibex club Islamabad, 2010
 2nd place at IMD 2010 Climbing Competition ( Open – Pro/Tech ), Ibex club Islamabad, 2010
 1st Place at 5th Pakistan Open Rock Climbing Competition on IWD - 2011 (Professional Difficulty), Jasmine Center Maragalla Hills, 2011
 1st Place at Pakistan Day Rock Climbing Competition - 2011 (Speed climbing), Islamabad, 2011
 2nd Place at IMD Pakistan Open Climbing Competition - 2011 (18+), Ibex club Islamabad, 2011

In 2014 he took part in an exploratory expedition to find out possibilities of frozen waterfall climbing in the Kaghan valley of Pakistani Himalayas.

Mountaineering 
In 2012 he climbed Malika Parbat() in Kaghan Valley of Pakistan. It is the highest peak of Hazara division and considered to be very technical. Malika parbat is reported to be first climbed by British army officers in 1940. Junaidi attempted it with a Danish climber Jens J. Simonsen(Deputy head of mission at the Danish Embassy in Islamabad). On 27 July 2012 they followed the north ridge  to gain the summit.

In July 2014 he successfully climbed "Little Trango", a  granite tower in the Trango group in the Karakoram mountains. He and Usman started on the southwest side of the formation but reached a dead end and had to traverse right to join the American route on the south face. In total, the duo climbed  at 5.10d A0 in two days. Imran Junaidi lead all the nine pitches and they decided to name the route "Eid Mubarak".

Other activities 
Imran Junaidi was one of the founding members of Pakistan Alpine Institute. He also engaged in route setting. He is responsible for some new challenging routes in the Margalla hills near Islamabad which he bolted with John Arran. He also took part in exploration and setting up routes at Chenab Rocks in central Punjab in October 2012. He has also engaged in climbing/rescue training, social work and motivational speaking. He is nationwide famous for taking initiatives. He is the pioneer of big wall climbing in Pakistan

Death 
Imran Junaidi was on an expedition in August 2015 with two other climbers Usman Tariq and Khurram Shehzad. They were attempting the  Sarwali peak(also called Toshe Ri) in Neelum valley, Azad Kashmir, Pakistan which is a neighbor of the notorious Nanga Parbat massif. The next day they were last seen at around  after which communication was lost with the base camp. After continued radio silence base camp manager Awais descended to the nearest town Kel and requested search and rescue on 4 September. A search and rescue was started on 7 September. After about 2–3 weeks the search operation was called off. Judging by the region of the highest camp reached and terrain, falling into a crevice was decided to be the most probable cause of the accident.

References

External links
 Imran's profile on Pakistan Alpine Institute official website
 Pakistan Alpine Institute Official

2015 deaths
Pakistani rock climbers
Pakistani mountain climbers
Year of birth missing